Living Colour is an American rock band from New York City, formed in 1984. The band currently consists of guitarist Vernon Reid, lead vocalist Corey Glover, drummer Will Calhoun and bassist Doug Wimbish (who replaced Muzz Skillings in 1992). Stylistically, their music is a creative fusion influenced by heavy metal, funk, jazz, hip hop, punk, and alternative rock. The band's lyrics range from the personal to the political, including social commentary on racism in the United States.

Living Colour has released six studio albums so far. The band rose to fame with their debut album Vivid in 1988. Although they scored several hits, Living Colour is best known for their signature anthem "Cult of Personality", which won a Grammy Award for Best Hard Rock Performance in 1990. They were also named Best New Artist at the 1989 MTV Video Music Awards and won their second Grammy Award for their follow-up album Time's Up (1990). Their third album, Stain (1993), was also well received by music critics. After disbanding in 1995, Living Colour reunited in late 2000, and has released three more studio albums since then: Collideøscope (2003), The Chair in the Doorway (2009) and Shade (2017). The band has been in the process of working on new material for the follow-up to Shade.

History

Early years (1984–1986)
English-born guitarist Vernon Reid had formed several bands, and after a few years, he formed Living Colour in New York in 1984, using the British spelling of "colour". Reid assembled several bands under the name Vernon Reid's Living Colour from 1984 to 1986.  Reid was well known on the downtown New York jazz scenes because of his tenure in Ronald Shannon Jackson's Decoding Society.

Early band members included bassists Alex Mosely, Jerome Harris and Carl James, drummers Greg Carter, Pheeroan akLaff and J. T. Lewis, keyboardist Geri Allen, and vocalists D. K. Dyson and Mark Ledford, with Reid occasionally singing lead vocals himself. The band's sound was vastly different from the songs later in their significant label recordings. Material from this period included instrumental jazz/funk workouts, politically pointed punk rock burners, experimental excursions via Reid's guitar synth, and an early version of the song "Funny Vibe", which was reworked for their debut album Vivid.

Mainstream success (1986–1991)

In 1986 a stable lineup was formed, consisting of vocalist/actor Corey Glover, guitarist Vernon Reid, bassist Muzz Skillings, and drummer Will Calhoun (who had graduated with honors from Berklee College of Music). After hiring managers Jim Grant and Roger Cramer, the band hired prodigy lighting designer Andy Elias in November 1986 to strengthen their live shows with explosive visual productions. Soon after, the band became experienced at touring and performed regular gigs at the club CBGB. Around this time, their career also benefited from English Rolling Stones singer Mick Jagger's involvement; Jagger was aware of Living Colour from working with bassist Doug Wimbish, and after going to see the band live at CBGBs, he went on to produce two of their demos; his 'endorsement' encouraged Epic Records to sign Living Colour. Interviewed in 2018, Vernon Reid looked back on the deal as a bittersweet triumph; "We had to get the co-sign from a person who literally embodied what rock 'n' roll is, the fact that he had to come see us, and dig us, for us to get at the back of the line is crazy."

Vivid, released on May 3, 1988, gathered sales momentum when later that year, MTV began playing the video for "Cult of Personality". The album reached #6 on the U.S. Billboard 200 chart. On April 1, 1989, the band performed on NBC's Saturday Night Live. Four months later, the band gained further exposure as an opening act, along with Guns N' Roses, for The Rolling Stones' Steel Wheels/Urban Jungle Tour.

In 1990 the band's second full-length album, Time's Up, featured songs in numerous musical contexts; jazz fusion, punk rock, Delta blues, hip hop (cameos by Queen Latifah and Doug E. Fresh), funk, thrash metal, jive, and hints of electronica were all represented. The album reached #13 on the Billboard 200, and won a Grammy Award for Best Hard Rock Performance. Other guests included Maceo Parker and Little Richard.

In 1991, Living Colour joined the inaugural Lollapalooza tour, and released an EP of outtakes entitled Biscuits.

Second lineup and breakup (1992–1995)
In 1992, Skillings left the band and was replaced by Doug Wimbish. This new lineup released their third full-length album, Stain, in March 1993. The album reached #26 in the U.S., a further drop since its debut. Despite retaining their strong fan base, Living Colour disbanded in January 1995 after failing to settle on common musical goals during their fourth studio album sessions. Four of these tracks were included on the compilation Pride. Following the breakup, individual band members released a variety of solo efforts.

Reunion and subsequent events (2000–present)
Living Colour re-formed on December 21, 2000, at CBGB as a gig billed "Head>>Fake w/ special guests". Head>>Fake was the current drum and bass project headed by Calhoun and Wimbish. Glover was on the bill to sing a few songs, and Reid came on after three songs. The reunion was followed by the release of the band's fourth studio album, Collideøscope, in 2003, their first album not to chart in the United States, although it was critically praised. In 2005, Sony Records released Live from CBGB's, a live album recorded on December 19, 1989, as well as another best-of compilation, Everything Is Possible: The Very Best of Living Colour, with songs from Vivid to Collideøscope.
On September 22, 2006, Skillings joined the band for the first time in fourteen years when they played at a private party that drummer Jack DeJohnette threw for his wife, Lydia. Wimbish could not come back from his base in London to play for the event, so Skillings agreed to take over for the special private event.

The band performed a week-long European Tour starting on December 12, 2006. In May 2007, the band released their first live DVD - On Stage At World Cafe Live. On July 11, 2008, the band performed at the 1980s hard rock-themed Rocklahoma festival at Pryor, Oklahoma. Once again, Skillings performed with them in August 2008 for a Black Rock Coalition Band of Gypsys tribute in Harlem. They performed "Them Changes" and "Power of Soul".

On October 25, 2008, MVD Audio and CBGB Records released CBGB OMFUG MASTERS: August 19, 2005 The Bowery Collection, a soundboard collection of songs from the Save CBGB's benefit show. On November 25, 2008, Inakustik and MVD released The Paris Concert, a DVD recorded at New Morning, in Paris, France, during their 2007 European Tour. The band released their fifth studio album, The Chair in the Doorway, on September 15, 2009, on Megaforce Records. The album sold approximately 2,800 copies in its first week and landed at #161 on the Billboard 200. This was the band's first album to chart since Stain in 1993. The band toured the world in support of the record.

In an interview on breakdownroom.net, Glover hoped to release another album with the band next year. "We're going to do something different [for us] and make a real record, right now, right after we've done this one," Glover said with a laugh. The band's song "Cult of Personality" received fresh exposure in 2011, as it was used as the entrance music for professional wrestler CM Punk. In 2013, Living Colour performed the song live during Punk's entrance at WrestleMania 29.

On July 2, 2014, Living Colour announced on their official website that they were putting the finishing touches on their upcoming sixth album Shade, which was released on September 8, 2017. "Shade is the sound of a band coming to terms with its shadows and light, From the blue pulpit of Robert Johnson to the mean red streets of Brooklyn to the golden lure of Hollywood, Shade is the next chapter of a unique American journey," Reid stated on the official website. The album includes ten originals and three covers: Robert Johnson's "'Preachin' Blues", Notorious B.I.G.'s "Who Shot Ya?" and Marvin Gaye's "Inner City Blues'" available on CD, MP3, and vinyl.

On August 19, 2016 the band released a cover of The Notorious B.I.G.'s "Who Shot Ya?", from an upcoming EP entitled Mixtape which was released on September 9. It features appearances from Chuck D, Black Thought, Pharoahe Monch, Prodigal Sunn, and Kyle Mansa.

By late 2018, Living Colour had begun working on new material for a possible EP or seventh full-length studio album. When asked about a month after the release of Shade if fans would have to wait another four years for the follow-up album, Reid replied, "Well I don't know about all that. It's intriguing to be back in this cycle." The band announced on December 10, 2022, that they had entered the studio to begin recording their seventh studio album.

Acclaim and legacy
Living Colour was ranked No. 70 on VH1's 100 Greatest Artists of Hard Rock.

"Cult of Personality" was re-recorded for Guitar Hero III: Legends of Rock, with an updated solo, as the original masters could not be used.

In October 2006, "Love Rears Its Ugly Head" was ranked and voted 303 out of the 2006 songs featured in the Triple M Essential 2006 Countdown.

Rolling Stone have called the band "funk metal pioneers."

In early 2009, WWE used "Cult of Personality" in the video promoting the induction of Stone Cold Steve Austin into its Hall of Fame. WWE performer CM Punk used the song as his entrance theme in Ring of Honor for some time. CM Punk used other licensed music while working with WWE, but, after feigning a departure from the company in July 2011, he returned with "Cult of Personality" as his entrance theme. CM Punk also entered to the song at his debut in the world of mixed martial arts at UFC 203 and subsequently at UFC 225 for his fight versus Mike Jackson. He later used the same song in his All Elite Wrestling debut at Rampage: The First Dance on August 20, 2021, and continues using it as his entrance theme.

Members

 Vernon Reid – lead guitar, guitar synthesizer, programming, laptop, backing vocals (1984–1995, 2000–present); lead vocals (1984–1985)
 Corey Glover – lead vocals, occasional rhythm guitar, occasional tambourine (1985–1995, 2000–present)
 Will Calhoun – drums, percussion, keyboards, samples, loops, programming, backing vocals (1986–1995, 2000–present)
 Doug Wimbish – bass, drums, guitar, programming, backing vocals (1992–1995, 2000–present)

Former Members
 Alex Mosely – bass
Jerome Harris – bass
 Carl James – bass
 Greg Carter – drums
Pheeroan akLaff – drums
 J. T. Lewis – drums
Geri Allen – keyboards (died; 2017)
 D. K. Dyson – lead vocals
Mark Ledford – lead vocals (died; 2004)
 Muzz Skillings – bass, backing vocals (1986–1991, one-off show in 2006)

Discography

Vivid (1988)
Time's Up (1990)
Stain (1993)
Collideøscope (2003)
The Chair in the Doorway (2009)
Shade (2017)

Awards

MTV Video Music Awards
1989 - Best New Artist ("Cult of Personality")
1989 - Best Group Video ("Cult of Personality")
1989 - Best Stage Performance ("Cult of Personality")

Grammy Awards
1990 - Best Hard Rock Performance (won) ("Cult of Personality")
1990 - Best Rock Performance by a Duo or Group with Vocal (nominated) ("Glamour Boys")
1991 - Best Hard Rock Performance (won) (Time's Up)
1994 - Best Hard Rock Performance (nominated) ("Leave It Alone")

References

External links

1984 establishments in New York City
African-American hard rock musical groups
African-American heavy metal musical groups
American alternative metal musical groups
American experimental rock groups
American funk metal musical groups
Epic Records artists
Grammy Award winners
Hard rock musical groups from New York (state)
Heavy metal musical groups from New York (state)
Megaforce Records artists
Musical groups established in 1984
Musical groups disestablished in 1995
Musical groups reestablished in 2000
Musical groups from New York City
Musical quartets
Political music groups